A moderately extensive bushfire season, particularly in western Victoria where fires were most prominent, occurred in mid-late January 2006 as conditions persisted across the state.

Timeline

January 2006
Bushfires in Victoria were prominent in mid-late January 2006 as conditions permitted across the state. With the loss of 4 lives and 57 homes. On Australia Day, a CFA volunteer died in the Victorian fires. Arsonists were charged with lighting fires that spread through western Victoria in late January. Two people died in The Grampians when their car was overcome by the Mount Lubra bushfire.

Fires of note

References

2005
Australian bushfire season
Australian bushfire season
2005 crimes in Australia
2006 crimes in Australia
Bushfire
Bushfire
Bush 
Bush